The Tishomingo City Hall on W. Main St. in Tishomingo, Oklahoma, also known as Bank of the Chickasaw Nation, was built in 1911.  It was listed on the National Register of Historic Places in 1975.

It was "designed, constructed, and finished under the direction of J. A. Shannon, an architect who was also superintendent" of the Harris Granite Quarries, source for its granite.

References

City and town halls on the National Register of Historic Places in Oklahoma
Government buildings completed in 1911
Buildings and structures in Johnston County, Oklahoma
Chickasaw
1911 establishments in Oklahoma
National Register of Historic Places in Johnston County, Oklahoma
City halls in Oklahoma